In Trance We Trust (ITWT) is a Dutch record label owned by Tijs Verwest and Arny Bink. It is a sublabel of Black Hole Recordings, established in 1998 and best known for its clubbier and a little harder side of trance music, and for its compilation of the same name.

Catalog

Albums
 Artist Albums
 ITWT 001 ALBUM Eyal Barkan - V.I.P.
 ITWT 002 ALBUM First State - Time Frame
 ITWT 003 ALBUM Tom Cloud - A New Day
 ITWT 004 ALBUM T4L - Biogenesis
 ITWT 005 ALBUM Tom Cloud - The Sky Is The Limit

 Digital Albums

 ITWT 001 DIGITAL ALBUM Impact - Immortal Vision
 ITWT 002 DIGITAL ALBUM Midway - Equator

Compilations
DJ Mixes

 ITWT 001 CD Misja Helsloot - In Trance We Trust 001
 ITWT 002 CD Stigma - In Trance We Trust 002
 ITWT 003 CD Lars Holte - In Trance We Trust 003
 ITWT 004 CD Johan Gielen - In Trance We Trust 004
 ITWT 005 CD Cor Fijneman - In Trance We Trust 005
 ITWT 006 CD Cor Fijneman - In Trance We Trust 006
 ITWT 007 CD Misja Helsloot - In Trance We Trust 007
 ITWT 008 CD Ton T.B. - In Trance We Trust 008
 ITWT 009 CD Mark Norman - In Trance We Trust 009
 ITWT 010 CD Various Artists - In Trance We Trust: Collector's Edition 1
 ITWT 011 CD Phynn - In Trance We Trust 011
 ITWT 012 CD Johan Gielen - In Trance We Trust 012
 ITWT 013 CD Carl B - In Trance We Trust 013
 ITWT 014 CD DJ Daniel Wanrooy - In Trance We Trust 014
 ITWT 015 CD DJ Virtual Vault - In Trance We Trust 015
 ITWT 016 CD DJ Observer & Daniel Heatcliff - In Trance We Trust 016
 ITWT 017 CD Bobina - In Trance We Trust 017
 ITWT 018 CD DJ Marc Simz - In Trance We Trust 018
 ITWT 019 CD DJ Kris O'Neil - In Trance We Trust 019
 ITWT 020 CD Menno de Jong, Mike Saint-Jules & Sneijder - In Trance We Trust 020
 ITWT 021 CD Adam Ellis - In Trance We Trust 021
 ITWT 022 CD Menno de Jong - In Trance We Trust 022

 ITWT DC 01 Various Artists - In Trance We Trust: Collected Works

Xtra Nordic Edition

 ITWT 001 CDX John Storm - In Trance We Trust Xtra Nordic Edition
 ITWT 002 CDX SL - In Trance We Trust Xtra Nordic Edition 2
 ITWT 003 CDX SL - In Trance We Trust Xtra Nordic Edition 3

Australia Series
 ITWTAU001 First State & James Brooke - In Trance We Trust Australia 001
 ITWTAU002 Lange & Steve Strangis - In Trance We Trust Australia 002

Singles

See also
 SongBird

References

External links

Dutch record labels
Trance record labels
Record labels established in 1998
Electronic music record labels
Electronic dance music record labels